Zanguiyeh or Zanguyeh may refer to various places in Iran:
 Zanguiyeh, Firuzabad (زنگويه - Zangūīyeh), Fars Province
 Zanguyeh, Khonj (زنگويه - Zangūyeh), Fars Province
 Zanguiyeh, Jiorft (زنگوييه = Zangū’īyeh), Kerman Province
 Zanguiyeh-ye Olya, Zarand County, Kerman Province